This is a list of earthquakes in 1988. Only magnitude 6.0 or greater earthquakes appear on the list. Lower magnitude events are included if they have caused death, injury, or damage. All dates are listed according to UTC time. Maximum intensities are indicated on the Modified Mercalli intensity scale and are sourced from United States Geological Survey (USGS) ShakeMap or the National Geophysical Data Center. Earthquake activity in 1988 was relatively low, with only 11 major events and none of magnitude 8.0+ occurring. Nevertheless, extremely destructive events took place in Burma, Nepal, China and Armenia. Burma saw two deadly earthquakes just a few months apart with the latter (on the Chinese border) claiming the lives of nearly a thousand. The Armenia earthquake in December was the deadliest earthquake in this year, with more than 25,000 deaths recorded. Early this year, Australia was also struck by an unusual series of strong earthquakes.

Overall

By death toll 

 Note: At least 10 casualties

By magnitude 

 Note: At least 7.0 magnitude

Notable events

January

February

March

April

May

June

July

August

September

October

November

December

References 

1988 natural disasters
1988 earthquakes
1988
1988